William Lawler was a farmer from New Coeln, Wisconsin who served as a local official and spent a single term as a member of the Wisconsin State Assembly. He was born in Gurteen, Queen's County, Ireland, on February 15, 1824.

References 

People from Oak Creek, Wisconsin
Irish emigrants to the United States (before 1923)
People from Milwaukee County, Wisconsin
Democratic Party members of the Wisconsin State Assembly
People from County Laois